Renyi or Rényi may refer to:

People 
Alfréd Rényi (1921-1970), Hungarian mathematician
Tibor Rényi (1973-), Hungarian painter
Tom Renyi (1947-), American banker and businessman

Locations in China 
Renyi, Rongchang County (仁义镇), town in Rongchang County, Chongqing
Renyi, Hezhou (仁义镇), town in Babu District, Hezhou, Guangxi
Renyi, Guiyang County (仁义镇), town in Guiyang County, Hunan
 Renyi, Leiyang (仁义镇), a town of Leiyang City, Hunan.